This is an incomplete list of rugby union players who have played for more than one national team. 

Not included in this list are:
Players who could choose to play for a new country after the dissolution of their former country. For example, players from the former Soviet Union who have gone on to play for Russia, or from the former Yugoslavia who have gone on to play for Croatia.
 Players who have played for both a combined team such as the British and Irish Lions or South American Jaguars, and one of its constituent national teams. For example, a player does not qualify for the list if they had played for the Lions as well as one of its constituents (England, Ireland, Scotland or Wales), but would qualify if they had played for the Lions and Australia.

Played rugby union for more than one national team

Notes

 Tom Richards played for the British Lions but never played for any of the national teams represented by the Lions (England, Ireland, Scotland or Wales).
 John Robbie played for Ireland, the British Lions and South Africa (reserve)
 Topo Rodriguez also played for the South American Jaguars

Played rugby union for more than one national team, sevens being one of the teams

Played rugby union for more than one national team - first team did not capture eligibility

Played rugby union for more than one national team - first team as junior

Notes

 Brad Barritt also played for the South Africa Under 21s

See also
List of nationality transfers in sport

References

Lists of international rugby union players